See Mashriqi Jews for more information about Jews in the rest of North Africa and Western Asia.

Established Jewish communities had existed in North Africa long before the arrival of Sephardi Jews, expelled from Portugal and Spain. Due to proximity, the term 'Maghrebi Jews' (Moroccan Jews, Algerian Jews, Tunisian Jews, and Libyan Jews) sometimes refers to Egyptian Jews as well, even though there are important cultural differences between the history of Egyptian and Maghrebi Jews. These Jews originating from North Africa constitute the second largest Jewish diaspora group.

Maghrebi Jews lived in multiple communities in North Africa for over 2,000 years, with the oldest Jewish communities present during Roman times and possibly as early as within Punic colonies of the Ancient Carthage period. Maghrebi Jews largely mixed with the newly arrived Sephardic Jews, beginning from the 13th century until the 16th century, eventually being overwhelmed by Sephardim and embracing the Sephardic Jewish identity in most cases.

The mixed Maghrebi-Sephardic Jewish communities collapsed in the mid-20th century as part of the Jewish exodus from Arab countries, moving mostly to Israel, France, Canada and Venezuela. Today, descendants of Maghrebi-Sephardic Jews in Israel have largely embraced the renovated Israeli Jewish identity and in many cases intermix with Ashkenazi and Mizrahi Jewish communities there. Some of the Maghrebi-Sephardic Jews (literally Western Jews) also consider themselves as part of Mizrahi Jewish community (literally Eastern, or Babylonian Jews), even though there is no direct link between the two communities. They have similar histories of Arabic-speaking background and a parallel exodus from Arab and Muslim countries: the Mizrahim left nations of the Middle East, and the Maghrebi-Sephardics left nations of North Africa in the mid-20th century.

Early History

Pre-1492 

Some Jewish settlements in North Africa date back to pre-Roman times, possibly correlating with the late Punic settlements in the area.

Earlier mentions of Jewish presence go back to Cyrenaica, a Greek colony of eastern Libya and home to an early Jewish community. Notable Cyrenaic Jews of that era includes Simon of Cyrene mentioned in the New Testament. After Jewish defeat in the First Jewish-Roman War in 70 CE, Roman General Titus deported many Jews to Mauretania, which roughly corresponds to the modern Maghreb, and many of them settled in what is now Tunisia. These settlers engaged in agriculture, cattle-raising, and trade. They were divided into clans, or tribes, governed by their respective heads, and had to pay the Romans a capitation tax of 2 shekels.

During the Kitos War, Jews must have suffered losses, but they continued to thrive in parts of North Africa under the Late Roman Empire. After 429 CE, with the fairly tolerant Vandals, the Jewish residents of the North African province increased and prospered to such a degree that African Church councils decided to enact restrictive laws against them. Berber lands east of Alexandria were relatively tolerant and were historically very welcoming for Christians and Jews during the Roman Empire notably. After the overthrow of the Vandals by Belisarius in 534 CE, Justinian I issued his edict of persecution, in which the Jews were classed with the Arians and s.

A community settled in Djerba island off the coast of southern Tunisia during the Roman period. Mainly composed of Cohanim, they notably built the Ghriba synagogue with stones coming directly from Jerusalem. 'La Ghriba' is still to this day annually visited by many North African Jews.

Under Muslim domination Jewish communities developed in important urban centers such as Kairouan and coastal cities of Tunisia, in Tlemcen, Béjaïa and Algiers in the Central Maghreb and as far as in the extreme Maghreb (modern Morocco) especially Fes and in the Atlas Mountains among the Berber populations. The relationships between Muslims and Jews in the Maghreb were relatively good thanks to the Al Andalus peaceful era, until the ascension of the Almohades, who persecuted non-Muslims to a large extent during their early reign. Later Jews were relatively well treated by the Berber Muslim dynasties, namely the Merinids, Zianides and Zirides.

In the seventh century, the Jewish population was augmented by Iberian Jewish immigrants, who, fleeing from the persecutions of the Visigothic king Sisebut and his successors, escaped to the Maghreb and settled in the local Byzantine Empire. The much greater immigration of Sephardic Jews took place between 1391 and 1492, due to the Alhambra decree edict of expulsion and persecution in Spain and Portugal.

Fez and Tunis, respectively in Morocco and Tunisia, became important Sephardic rabbinical centers, well until the early 20th century, when most Jewish populations emigrated to Israel, France, Canada and Latin America.

Expulsion from Spain after 1492 
While there has been a presence of Jews in the Maghreb region of North Africa in both Berber and Arabic speaking communities for millennia, many Spanish Jews were driven out of Spain during the Spanish Inquisition of 1492.

The Spanish Inquisition was ultimately a religiously motivated movement that strove to maintain and strengthen the Catholic presence in Spain. The rulers, Ferdinand and Isabella, ordered the expulsion of the Spanish Jews in January of 1492, and on 30 July 1492, hundreds of thousands of Spanish Jews were driven out of Spain, relocating primarily to the Maghreb region due to its close proximity to Spain, but also to other places such as Greece, Italy, and Turkey.

Around the time of the Spanish Inquisition the Counter-Reformation was taking place. The Counter-Reformation was the Catholic response to the Protestant reformation, a movement in Europe that strived to popularize the newer sect of Christianity, Protestantism, throughout Europe. The Counter-Reformation mostly took place in Southern Europe, which is a large reason as to why Southern Europe is, for the most part, far more Catholic and far less Protestant than the majority of Northern Europe. The Counter-Reformation, being a movement to preserve and strengthen the Catholic influence on society, was opposed not only to Protestantism but to any non-Catholic belief that was seen as a threat to the Catholic society. Thus, the Jews of Spain overwhelmingly moved directly south to the Maghreb Region of North Africa and quickly prospered.

Recent history

World War II and the Holocaust 

On the eve of World War II, 400,000 Jews resided in the Maghreb; throughout this time, each country differed in its treatment of its respective Jewish population.

Algerian Jews (approximately 35,000) had been granted French citizenship by the Cremieux Decree in 1870. France's Vichy Regime, then, oversaw the Jewish community in Algeria during World War II and imposed anti-Semitic measures such as stripping Jews of their civil rights, forcing them to wear identification markers, and putting quotas on their admission to primary schools.

Tunisia was the only country with direct contact with the German army; Germany occupied the country for six months from 1942 to 1943 until it was recaptured by the Allied forces. Under German occupation, the Jewish population, then 89,000, endured the Nazi regime and were subjected to harsh mistreatment.

In Morocco, there were anti-Jewish laws put into effect and at least 2,100 Jews were forcibly interned in work camps.

Emigration 

The creation of the state of Israel in 1948 helped foster a sense of anti-Jewish behavior in Muslim-majority areas, contributing significantly to the emigration of Jews from the countries of the Maghreb. This exodus was augmented with the independence of the Maghreb countries in the 1950s and early 1960s, as Jews were seen as being supportive of the previous colonial French.

Tunisia was a French protectorate since 1881, and the country fought for independence from 1952 to 1956, after which many of the 105,000 Jews within the community emigrated. In recent decades, the Jewish community has continued to shrink as many emigrated to Israel, France, and other countries.

After Morocco declared independence in 1956, most of the 225,000 Jews in Morocco emigrated to Israel, France and Canada.

In Algeria, the National Liberation Front fought and won independence from France in 1961. After Algeria won independence, the Jewish population of 140,000 began a massive and definitive exodus mainly to France.

Maghrebi Jews in Israel 
The early Zionists were overwhelmingly Ashkenazi Jews who affiliated themselves strongly with Theodor Herzl, the founder of modern Zionism. Maghrebi Jews, along with other Mizrahi Jews and Sephardi Jews, did not begin to arrive in Israel until after Israel was established as a state. The early Zionists were also overwhelmingly secular, as Zionism as Herzl founded it was a secular nationalist movement that recognized Jews as a whole as a Nation, and saw the Land of Israel as the ancestral homeland of the Jews.

In the mid 20th Century, the Arab World (in this case North Africa) began to undergo some vast internal changes. The notion of Pan-Arabism came about in the earlier years of the 20th Century, and the cultural, linguistic, and political influences of European colonial powers in the region began to sharply decline. A sentiment of Arab unity that opposed any form of colonialism arose quickly throughout the 20th century. With this new sentiment across North Africa and the rest of the Arab World, Zionism came to be heavily opposed, as many Arab leaders saw the movement as simply a continuation of European colonialism, due to the vast majority of early Zionist settlers coming from Europe.

Maghrebi Jews have an enormous cultural influence in Israel. Falafel is widely known as the National Food of Israel, and due to falafel's origins in the Middle East and North Africa, Maghrebi Jews, along with other Sephardic and Mizrahi Jews from the Middle East and North Africa, played an enormous role in making falafel an Israeli staple. Mizrahi music, one of Israel's most popular genres, carries a lot of influence from Maghrebi Jews. Some popular Mizrahi music singers of Maghrebi descent include: Eyal Golan, Sarit Hadad, Moshe Peretz, Dana International, Zehava Ben, and Kobi Peretz, all of Moroccan descent.

Religiously, Maghrebi Jews (along with Sephardic/Mizrahi Jews as a whole) are heavily classified as Masortim, contrasting Israelis of Ashkenazi Jewish descent, whom are more secular. Politically, Maghrebi Jews tend to vote Likud.

Communities

Morocco 

Morocco, the North African nation with the largest Jewish population both at the start of the 20th Century and today, had a Jewish population of ~275,000 at its peak around the time of the establishment of Israel. A significant number of Moroccan Jews are descendants of the Berber-speaking Jews who once lived in the Atlas Mountains. Today, the Jewish population in Morocco is estimated to be just over 2,000. Since the expulsion from Spain after 1492, Moroccan Jews shared many customs of everyday life and a common spoken language (Berber or Moroccan Arabic) with their Muslim neighbours, which led to a rich mutual cultural heritage of music, poetry, food and crafts.

After the establishment of Israel,  a mass exodus of the Jewish population began and the vast majority of Moroccan Jews emigrated to Israel, as very few Moroccan Jews had left before to Mandatory Palestine. Israel launched a series of operations to bring Jews, who were facing persecution, to Israel from various Middle Eastern and North African countries. A famous operation that brought nearly 100,000 Moroccan Jews to Israel from 1961 to 1964 was Operation Yachin.

Today, Jews of Moroccan descent in Israel tend to identify with their background and remain in touch with their traditional culture. A part of Moroccan Jewish culture revolves around Sephardic music and food. Shakshouka, a traditional Maghrebi dish, has become popular in Israel through the influence of Moroccan Jews.

Algeria 

Algerian Jews are quite similar to Moroccan Jews in many regards due to the proximity of Algeria and Morocco. Both communities were intertwined linguistically, culturally, and historically. A Jewish presence in Algeria existed since before the Roman-era, but most Algerian Jews trace a significant amount of their history back to the culture of al-Andalus.

In the 1930s and 1940s, nearly the entire continent of Africa was colonized. Algeria belonged to France; however, during World War II, Adolf Hitler and his Nazi forces took interest in the heavy Jewish presence in North Africa. The Algerian Jewish community was one of the most affected by Hitler's motives. At the time of World War II, there were around 130,000 Jews living in Algeria; today there are none.

Algerian Jews are unique in that they are the only community of North African Jews that did not overwhelmingly emigrate to Israel during the Jewish exodus from Arab and Muslim countries; instead, the majority of Algerian Jews chose France as their destination.

Tunisia 

Tunisia was directly occupied by the Nazi forces of Germany from November 1942 to May 1943. The Nazi implemented a regime of forced-labor, property confiscation, hostage-taking, mass extortion, deportations, and executions. Thousands of countryside Jews were forced to wear the Star of David. The population of Tunisian Jews stood at around 105,000 in 1948. After independence in 1956, a series of anti-Semitic measures were taken, driving a immigration wave of 40,000 Tunisians Jews to Israel. The number of Tunisians Jews decreased to around 20,000 by 1967. A further 7,000 Jews immigrated to France, following anti-Semitic riots during the Six-Day War. As of 2018, the population of Jews in Tunisia is numbered at around 1,100.

Tunisia's former Tourism Minister, René Trabelsi, is Jewish.

Libya 

Libyan Jews are the smallest community of all Maghrebi Jews, yet the community is still rich in history, tradition, and culture. The history of Libyan Jews is one that is approximately 2,300 years old, and the population of Jews in Libya peaked at around 40,000 in 1945.

As Libya was occupied by Italy throughout most of the first half of the 20th century, the racial laws that targeted Jews and minimized their freedoms were enacted in Libya. As the Italians enacted laws that directly exploited and suppressed Jews, the Jews of Libya were more welcoming to the arrival of the Allies of World War II's entering Libya. Italy saw the Jews as enemies, and Mussolini sought to cleanse Libya of its Jewish population, a movement called Sfollamento. Through the movement of Sfollamento, Libyan Jews were sent to concentration camps; the location of those camps depended on if they had British, French, or Libyan-Italian citizenship.

Libya was liberated by the Allies in January 1943, but even with the eradication of the racial laws, the conditions for Jews did not improve a whole lot. Anti-semitism was widespread amongst a Libyan culture that had just been heavily influenced by fascism; as a result, the vast majority of Libyan Jews emigrated, primarily to Israel once it was established as a state. The 1945 Anti-Jewish riots in Tripolitania sparked a pogrom that killed 140 Jews. Riots and anti-semitic violence did not subside, leaving the Jews of Libya with very little choice but to leave. Today, there are no more Jews living in Libya.

Genetics 

In 2012, a study by Campbel et al. found that North African Jews were more closely related to each other and to European and Middle Eastern Jews than to their non-Jewish host populations.The genome-wide ancestry of North African Jewish groups was compared with respect to European (Basque), Maghrebi (Tunisian non-Jewish), and Middle Eastern (Palestinian) origins. The Middle Eastern component was found to be comparable across all North African Jewish and non-Jewish groups (around 40%), while North African Jewish groups showed increased European (35-40 %) and decreased level of North African (Maghrebi) ancestry (20%) with Moroccan and Algerian Jews tending to be genetically closer to Europeans than Djerban Jews, the latter being a highly endogamous group.

See also

 Jewish culture
 Jewish diaspora
 Jewish ethnic divisions
 Jewish history
 Hebrews
 History of the Jews in Africa
 Carthaginian Jews
 History of the Jews under Muslim rule
 Israelites
 Judeo-Arabic
 Judeo-Berber
 Adeni Jews
 Arab Jews
 Ashkenazi Jews
 Berber Jews
 Mizrahi Jews
 Yemenite Jews
 Moroccan Jews in Israel
 Sephardi Jews
 Spanish and Portuguese Jews
 Eastern Sephardim
 North African Sephardim
 Islamic–Jewish relations
 Antisemitism in Islam
 Antisemitism in the Arab world
 Haketia

References

 A l'arrivée des Juifs espagnols : Mutation de la communauté . Richard Ayoun.